Fabyula Badawi (born 1960) is an Egyptian poet and journalist.

Born in Cairo, Badawi received a bachelor's degree in business administration and a graduate degree in accounting. As of 2008 she was employed by the Saudi newspaper al-Madina as a journalist. Three volumes of her poetry have been published. They are Mahlan ayyuha-l-rajul (Take it Easy, Man, 1989); Qasa'id zami'a (Thirsty Poems, 1990); and al-Washm) (The Tattoo, 1992).

References

1960 births
Living people
Egyptian women poets
20th-century Egyptian poets
20th-century Egyptian women writers
Egyptian women journalists
20th-century journalists
21st-century journalists
21st-century Egyptian women writers
Journalists from Cairo
21st-century Egyptian writers